This was the first edition of the tournament.

Ysaline Bonaventure and Ekaterine Gorgodze won the title, defeating Ángela Fita Boluda and Oksana Selekhmeteva in the final, 6–2, 2–6, [10–6].

Seeds

Draw

Draw

References

External links
Main Draw

BBVA Open Internacional de Valencia - Doubles